Kuusisto is an island and former municipality in Kaarina, Finland. The island is about 12 km long and 2 km wide. Its main attraction is Kuusisto Castle.

Villages 
Villages within Kuusisto:

 Empo (Ämboda)
 Finby, Isokylä (Storby)
 Joensuu (Åminne)
 Jullas, Järvenkylä (Träskby)
 Kalliola (Krogsby)
 Kerromi (Kärrom)
 Korsnainen (Korsnäs)
 Kylliäinen
 Munkke (Munkäng)
 Rävnäs (Räfnäs)
 Vuolahti

History 
Kuusisto was first mentioned in 1295. The construction of the bishop's castle began in 1316. The island was a part of the Piikkiö parish. After the Reformation, the bishop's castle was demolished. Some of its remains were used as materials for the Piikkiö church in 1755. Kuusisto gained chapel rights in 1653, eventually becoming a separate municipality and parish in 1914. It was consolidated with Kaarina in 1946.

As the municipality was disestablished before rural municipalities were allowed to use coats of arms, Kuusisto never had an official coat of arms. The heraldist Tapani Talari has designed an unofficial coat of arms for use by the Suomen Kuntaliitto ry.

Gallery

References

Former municipalities of Finland
Islands of Finland
Kaarina